André Rosseel (23 November 1924 in Lauwe – 8 December 1965 in Roeselare) was a Belgian professional road bicycle racer. Rosseel won 4 stages in the Tour de France.

Major results

1946
 national junior road race champion
1947
Anzegem
Omloop van Midden-Vlaanderen
1948
Aalst
Dwars door Vlaanderen
1950
Dwars door Vlaanderen
1951
Tour of Algeria
Gent–Wevelgem
Tour de France:
Winner stages 8 and 15
1952
Tour de France:
Winner stages 2 and 16
1953
Aalst
Emelgem
Ruiselede
1954
Koksijde
Heule
Tour du Nord
Moorsele
Saint-Ghislain
1955
Vlaamse pijl
Wervik
1956
Circuit des régions frontalières Mouscron
Kruishoutem
Ruddervoorde
Heule
Dentergem
Le Bizet
Roeselare
Zonnebeke
Waarschoot
1957
Aartrijke
Oedelem
Dentergem
Ploegsteert

External links 

Official Tour de France results for André Rosseel

Belgian male cyclists
1924 births
1965 deaths
Belgian Tour de France stage winners
People from Menen
Sportspeople from West Flanders
20th-century Belgian people